Selim Tataroğlu (born April 24, 1972) is a Turkish judoka. He competed at three Olympic Games.

Achievements

References

External links
 
 

1972 births
Living people
Turkish male judoka
Judoka at the 1996 Summer Olympics
Judoka at the 2000 Summer Olympics
Judoka at the 2004 Summer Olympics
Olympic judoka of Turkey
European champions for Turkey
Mediterranean Games silver medalists for Turkey
Mediterranean Games gold medalists for Turkey
Mediterranean Games medalists in judo
Competitors at the 1997 Mediterranean Games
Competitors at the 2005 Mediterranean Games
20th-century Turkish people
21st-century Turkish people